Mexican Spitfire Out West is a 1940 American comedy film directed by Leslie Goodwins and written by Charles E. Roberts and Jack Townley. It is the sequel to the 1940 film Mexican Spitfire and the second of the film series. The film stars Lupe Vélez, Leon Errol, Donald Woods, Elisabeth Risdon and Cecil Kellaway. The film was released on November 29, 1940, by RKO Pictures.

Plot
The Mexican spitfire goes to the wild wild west and has many great adventures with Mat.

Cast 
 Lupe Vélez as Carmelita Lindsay
 Leon Errol as Uncle Matt Lindsay / Basil, Lord Epping
 Donald Woods as Dennis 'Denny' Lindsay
 Elisabeth Risdon as Aunt Della Lindsay
 Cecil Kellaway as Mr. Chumley
 Linda Hayes as Elizabeth Price
 Lydia Bilbrook as Ada, Lady Epping
 Charles Coleman as Ponsby, the Butler
 Charles Quigley as Mr. Roberts
 Lester Dorr as Harry
 Eddie Dunn as Mr. Skinner
 Grant Withers as Withers
 Tom Kennedy as Taxi Driver

References

External links 
 
 
 
 

1940 films
American black-and-white films
RKO Pictures films
Films scored by Roy Webb
Films directed by Leslie Goodwins
1940 comedy films
American comedy films
Films produced by Cliff Reid
1940s English-language films
1940s American films